The Dominican Football Federation is the governing body of football in the Dominican Republic.

Liga Dominicana de Futbol

The Liga Dominicana de Fútbol is the top division for association football in Dominican Republic, it was created on September 16, 2014. The league begun in March 2015.
The Dominican Football Federation announced the creation of the Dominican Football League (LDF), in a ceremony held at the Ambassador Hotel Santo Domingo. The ceremony was attended by President of CONCACAF Jeffrey Webb , President of the Dominican Olympic Committee Luisín Mejia, the vice - minister of sports Marcos Diaz among others.
Ten teams participate in this league.

Football in the Dominican Republic
Football is the fourth most popular sport in the Dominican Republic, as baseball, basketball and volleyball are more popular. In recent years football has gained in popularity, particularly among young people. In 2001 the national association celebrated its first significant success, with the U-23 team winning the Copa de Las Antillas. The Dominican Republic has not yet qualified for FIFA World Cup 2026.

The first Goal Project

FIFA vice-president Jack Warner opened the Dominican Republic FAs new centre for football development on 2 July 2003. The building can be found just outside the city of San Cristobal. The first phase, involving building offices for the national association and classrooms for the people attending the courses of the various training programmes, will be financed by the Goal Programme, with extra funds coming from the FIFA Financial Assistance Programme. In the second phase, due to be completed by the end of 2003, various technical facilities, such as playing pitches and accommodation for players and coaches, will be constructed. The government has also donated  of land as part of this project.

Association staff

Financing of Goal project

Project
Centre for football development in San Cristobal

project approved 
4 March 2002

Status 
Opened on 2 July 2003

Total cost 
USD 430,922

Goal 
USD 400,000

FAP
USD 30,922

Second Goal project

The San Cristobal centre for football development inaugurated in July 2003 will be raised by one storey to accommodate bedrooms and medical rooms. A separate building nearby contains dressing rooms and toilets for everyone using the different pitches that also belong to the training centre. This extension is the culmination of the original plan for a fully equipped and functioning technical centre, funded by Goal and partly by the associations own resources.

Financing of Goal project

Project 
Extension of project 1 to the training centre

Project approved on 
15 March 2006

Status 
Implementation

Total cost
USD 535,221   Financed by

Goal 
USD 400,000

FAP 
USD 135,221

Other FIFA development activities

Until 1990
2 courses

1992, 1999
Futuro courses

1990
Olympic Solidarity course

Old logo

References

External links
 Official website
 Dominican Republic at the FIFA website
 Dominican Republic at CONCACAF site

Dominican Republic
Football in the Dominican Republic
Football
1953 establishments in the Dominican Republic
Sports organizations established in 1953